Sidamo may refer to:

 Sidamo Province, a province of Ethiopia until 1995, now part of the Somali, Southern Peoples, and Oromia Regions
 Galla-Sidamo Governorate, part of Italian East Africa from 1936 to 1941
 Ethiopian Sidamo, a type of Arabica coffee grown in the area of the former Sidamo Province
 Sidamo language, an Afro-Asiatic language spoken in parts of southern Ethiopia
 Charaxes sidamo, a butterfly of family Nymphalidae
 Macrocossus sidamo, a moth of family Cossidae

See also
 Sidama people, an ethnic group whose homeland is in the Sidama Zone of the SNNPR of Ethiopia
 Sidama Zone, Southern Nations, Nationalities, and Peoples' Region, Ethiopia
 Sidama Coffee, a football club based in Hawassa, Ethiopia